Jack Robinson (1921 – 20 March 1983) was an anarchist activist and editor of the Freedom paper. A conscientious objector, during the war he worked in an epileptic colony because he was a nurse by training. Linked to this he also took part in a medical experiment living on a diet which caused scurvy, but in fact he earned a good part of his living as a book trader. And his purchase of the tenancy linked to Albert Meltzer’s Wooden Shoe Press was the premise of the long dispute between Meltzer and Vernon Richards.

He worked alongside Lilian Wolfe and Mary Canipa in the Freedom Bookshop. Jack contributed quite a lot of articles for Freedom and Anarchy, sometimes anonymously, during the 1970s. Though he is thought to have had a hand in editorial group through the 60's.  At the request of Canipa his work was reproduced in Freedom: a hundred years put together by Donald Rooum, because by its publication date he had already died.

Jack Robinson enjoyed active stints, alongside Rooum in the Colne and Nelson Anarchist Group and was a noted non-smoker, a teetotaler and a vegetarian.

Publications

 Rooum, D (Ed.) "Freedom": A Hundred Years, October 1886-October 1986 London, Freedom Press, 1986 
 Rooum, D (Ed.) What Is Anarchism?: An Introduction, London, Freedom Press,

References

British newspaper editors
English anarchists
1983 deaths
1921 births